is a school of Ikebana, or Japanese floral art.

History 
It was established in 1922 in Nagoya.

The organisation is currently headed by the second-generation headmaster Ishida Shyūsui (二代家元　石田秀翠).

References

External links 

 

Kadō schools
Culture in Nagoya